Lawrence William Steinkraus (November 29, 1922 – December 4, 1992) was a Major General in the U.S. Air Force.  His last post was to serve as the Deputy Director for operations of the U.S. Joint Chiefs of Staff.

Prior to that position he served as deputy chief of staff for logistics at the Headquarters Strategic Air Command, and as Commander of the 319th Bombardment Wing, at Grand Forks Air Force Base in North Dakota.

Education
 Bachelor's degree in industrial management from Florida State University.
 Graduate of the Advanced Management School at the University of Colorado.

References

External links
Official Profile

United States Air Force generals
Florida State University alumni
1922 births
1992 deaths
Recipients of the Legion of Merit
American military personnel of World War II